Escadron de chasse et d'expérimentation 1/30 Côte d'Argent is a French Air and Space Force (Armée de l'air et de l'espace) Squadron located at BA 118 Mont-de-Marsan Air Base, Landes, France which operates the Dassault Rafale B, Dassault Mirage 2000D, Dassault/Dornier Alpha Jet and the SOCATA TBM 700.

See also

 List of French Air and Space Force aircraft squadrons

References

French Air and Space Force squadrons